Neolithodes grimaldii, the porcupine crab, is a species of king crab in the family Lithodidae. This large red crab is found in cold deep waters in the North Atlantic and often caught as a bycatch in fisheries for Greenland turbot (Greenland halibut). As suggested by its common name, the carapace and legs are covered in long spines.

Distribution and habitat
The porcupine crab is found on muddy bottoms on the continental slope in deep waters of the North Atlantic. In the western Atlantic, it ranges from eastern Canada and Greenland south as far as North Carolina in the United States. In the eastern Atlantic, it ranges from Iceland to Madeira, Portugal and Cape Verde, including the Porcupine Seabight and Rockall Trough off Ireland. Exceptionally, living singles have been caught in very shallow water, likely the result of turning icebergs suddenly forcing them up from the deep.

Based on radio tagging, some individuals will stay in a region for months, but others may move quite long distances.

Appearance
This deep red crab is covered in spines, which are long and robust in large adults, and very long and thin in young. They are often victims of Briarosaccus callosus (family Peltogastridae), a parasitic barnacle that causes sterility in the crab and also will use many other king crab species around the world as a host. In the porcupine crab, males infected by this barnacle average somewhat smaller than healthy males, while infected females average somewhat larger than healthy females.

Fishing
Fisheries for Greenland turbot (Greenland halibut) can have porcupine crabs as a bycatch, sometimes in large quantities; in 1996 alone several hundred thousand tonnes were caught off Canada. Despite this, the porcupine crab has not been targeted by fisheries because of the great depth it inhabits (unlike several other large king crab species that typically inhabit shallower depths and are heavily targeted by fisheries). It is, however, considered to have potential as a future fishing resource. As long as the porcupine crab is not injured during capture and release from the bottom gillnet, they have a high survival rate.

References

External links 

 
 

King crabs
Crustaceans described in 1894
Crabs of the Atlantic Ocean
Taxa named by Alphonse Milne-Edwards
Taxa named by Eugène Louis Bouvier